The J & J Ultralights Seawing is an American amphibious ultralight trike that was designed and produced by J & J Ultralights of Live Oak, Florida. The aircraft was supplied as a kit for amateur construction or as a complete aircraft.

J & J Ultralights is no longer in business and the design out of production.

Design and development
It features a cable-braced hang glider-style high wing, weight-shift controls, a single-seat or two-seats-in-tandem open cockpit, floats and retractable tricycle landing gear and a single engine in pusher configuration.

The aircraft is made from bolted-together anodized 6061-T6 aluminum and 4130 steel tubing, with its single-surface wing covered in Dacron sailcloth. Its  span wing is supported by a single tube-type kingpost and uses an "A" frame control bar. Buoyancy is provided by two  Full Lotus inflatable floats. The wheels retract above the floats for water operations and in ground operations the nosewheel is fully steerable. The wing uses a unique hand crank mechanism to fold the wing in place on the frame and then to fold it down for storage or ground transportation.

Two examples had been completed and flown by February 2005, when the price was listed as US$16,500.

Specifications (Seawing)

See also

References

External links
J & J website archives on Archive.org
Photo of a Seawing

1990s United States ultralight aircraft
Homebuilt aircraft
Single-engined pusher aircraft
Ultralight trikes